The 1995–96 season was Mansfield Town's 59th season in the Football League and 23rd in the Third Division they finished in 18th position with 53 points.

Final league table

Results

Football League Third Division

FA Cup

League Cup

League Trophy

Squad statistics
 Squad list sourced from

References
General
 Mansfield Town 1995–96 at soccerbase.com (use drop down list to select relevant season)

Specific

Mansfield Town F.C. seasons
Mansfield Town